The Public Health (Infectious Diseases) Regulations 1988, created by the Department of Health and Social Care, came into force on 1 October 1988 and was associated with the previous Public Health (Control of Disease) Act 1984. 24 more diseases were added, indicating exact control powers that could be applied to individual diseases.

Notifiable diseases
In addition to cholera, plague, relapsing fever, smallpox, typhus and food poisoning, the regulations of 1988 consist of 24 additional conditions:

Acute encephalitis
Acute poliomyelitis
Meningitis
Meningococcal septicaemia
Anthrax
Diphtheria
Dysentery
Paratyphoid fever
Typhoid fever
Viral hepatitis
Leprosy
Leptospirosis
Measles
Mumps
Rubella
Whooping cough
Malaria
Tetanus
Yellow fever
Ophthalmia neonatorum
Rabies
Scarlet fever
Tuberculosis
Viral haemorrhagic fever

Scotland and Northern Ireland required notification of chicken pox and legionellosis in addition to the above.

References 

Public health in the United Kingdom
Statutory Instruments of the United Kingdom
1988 in British law